Della Lee is a Singaporean former professional squash player who currently serves as the coach of the Singapore women's squash team. She has represented Singapore at few international competitions including the Women's World Team Squash Championships, Asian Games, Southeast Asian Games and in the Asian Squash Championships. She reached her highest career PSA world ranking of 66 in May 1999. Della Lee also holds a master's degree in international marketing.

Career 
Lee competed at the PSA World Tour from 1997 to 2001 until her retirement. As a part of the PSA World Tour, she represented the Singaporean team which took part at the 1992 Women's World Team Squash Championships as well as at the 1994 Women's World Team Squash Championships. She competed at her maiden Asian Games event in 1998 and claimed a bronze medal in the women's singles.

After winning a silver and a bronze at the 2001 Southeast Asian Games, she retired from playing squash and started a squash academy in Singapore along with former Malaysian squash player Sandra Wu.

References 

Living people
Singaporean female squash players
Squash players at the 1998 Asian Games
Squash players at the 1998 Commonwealth Games
Asian Games bronze medalists for Singapore
Southeast Asian Games silver medalists for Singapore
Southeast Asian Games bronze medalists for Singapore
Southeast Asian Games medalists in squash
Asian Games medalists in squash
Commonwealth Games competitors for Singapore
Victoria Junior College alumni
Year of birth missing (living people)
Medalists at the 1998 Asian Games
20th-century Singaporean women